Professional Football Club Ludogorets 1945, commonly known as Ludogorets Razgrad or simply Ludogorets, is a Bulgarian professional association football club based in Razgrad, which currently competes in the First Professional Football League, the top tier of the Bulgarian football league system.

In their inaugural 2011–12 season in A Group after promotion, Ludogorets won the treble by capturing the league championship, the Bulgarian Cup and the Bulgarian Supercup. Subsequently, the club made a significant continental impact in the 2013–14 UEFA Europa League when they reached the Round of 16 in only their second European run. To date they have reached the knockout stages of the Europa League four times, more than any other club in Bulgaria. Ludogorets are also only the second Bulgarian team after Levski Sofia to enter the group stage of the UEFA Champions League, a feat which they achieved in the following 2014–15 season. During that same campaign, they became the first Bulgarian team to score points in the modern Champions League group stage following a 1–0 win over Basel in Sofia.

Since their introduction to the Bulgarian top-flight in 2011, Ludogorets have established themselves as a dominant force in Bulgarian football, claiming every possible league title since then. They have also won the Bulgarian Cup twice, as well as the Bulgarian Supercup on six occasions.

Ludogorets' traditional home colours are green and white. The club's home ground is the Huvepharma Arena in Razgrad, a stadium with a capacity of 10,500 spectators. Their current manager is Ivaylo Petev.

History

Foundation and beginning
Established in November 1945 after the merging of several rural football clubs from the Ludogorie Region, Ludogorets Razgrad was initially participating in the Third football division of Bulgaria. They promoted to the Second division in 1961. In 1997 the club merged with FC Antibiotic Razgrad and was renamed to FC Antibiotic-Ludogorets. In 2005 the club was defunct. The rise of Ludogorets started in season 2009/10 when Aleksandar Aleksandrov, director of FC Razgrad 2000, inherited the history and traditional club records of the former Antibiotic-Ludogorets, returning the name to PFC Ludogorets 1945 Razgrad. The team managed to enter Second division when Ivaylo Petev was designated as a Head Coach.

Domuschiev era (2010–present)
In September 2010 the club was purchased by a Bulgarian pharmaceutical entrepreneur Kiril Domuschiev, with the clear intention of bringing Ludogorets to the top division. This happened in May 2011 with Ivaylo Petev as a Head Coach when the team promoted to top division for the first time in the club's history.

First title

In May 2012, Ludogorets completed the domestic double when they won their first Bulgarian Cup title following a 2:1 victory against Lokomotiv Plovdiv at Lazur Stadium in Burgas, and in August 2012, they won the Bulgarian Supercup, defeating Lokomotiv 3:1, thus becoming the first team to win a treble in its first season in A Group and one of the few in the history of international football to do so.

Second title

Ludogorets started the 2012–13 season with eight straight wins and nine matches without a loss, and finished the half-season in first place, as in the previous season, with just one loss and seven goals conceded out of 15 matches. However, in the 2012–13 Bulgarian Cup, the club was eliminated in the round of 32 by CSKA Sofia 2:2 on aggregate, losing on away goals. In the spring half-season, Ludogorets occupied the first place with just three matches to play before the end of the season. Nevertheless, they were defeated 1:0 by Levski Sofia and they took the lead of A Group. On the final day of the season, Ludogorets had to beat the already relegated team of Montana and hope that Slavia Sofia would prevent Levski from winning their match. In the last minutes of the Levski–Slavia match, Levski conceived an own goal which subsequently led to a 1:1 draw, allowing Ludogorets to win their second championship title in dramatic fashion again. In the 2013 Supercup, they lost 5:3 on penalties to Beroe Stara Zagora after a 1:1 draw in regular time.

Third title

In season 2013/14 Ludogorets became a hegemon in the Bulgarian club football. The "Eagles" earned their third consecutive title two rounds before the end of the championship on 7 May 2014. On 15 May 2014 Ludogorets achieved a treble after winning the Cup of Bulgaria against Botev (Plovdiv) 1-0 and the Super Cup. Both matches were played at the  "Lazur" stadium in Burgas.

Fourth title

Ludogorets' fourth title came after a home win against Lokomotiv (Sofia) with 4:1 on 15 May 2015. A new tribune, named after their defender Cosmin "Moti", and the 70th anniversary of the "Eagles" were celebrated at that time.

Fifth title

On 11 May 2016 Ludogorets became the Bulgarian Champion for the fifth time in a row.

Sixth title

The 2016/2017 season was the most successful in the history of Ludogorets. They became champions of Bulgaria for the sixth consecutive time with 16 points advantage over the runner-up. For the second time in the Bulgarian's football history the team entered the Champions League groups with Georgi Dermendzhiev as a Head Coach. They ranked third in the groups by winning 2 points and continued their European tournament participation in Europa League.

Seventh title

The 2017/2018 season was another successful one for Ludogorets. The team won their domestic league Champion's Title and performed well at both European Tournaments – Champions League and Europa League.

Eighth title

Ludogorets earned their 2018/2019 season title after a 4-1 home win over PFC Cherno More in May 2019.

Ninth title

Ludogorets' domination in Bulgaria continue. The champions won their record-breaking 9th consecutive title after a 2:1 win against Beroe in May 2020.

Tenth title

Ludogorets claimed their record-breaking 10th consecutive title after a 3-1 home win against Beroe Stara Zagora in May 2021. This phenomenal achievement led to the club putting star on the club's badge/crest to represent 10 league titles in the domestic Bulgarian football league.

Eleventh title

Ludogorets' domination continued. An eleventh consecutive domestic championship title, no one but them has such an achievement in Bulgarian league football history.

European
After winning the 2011–12 Bulgarian title, Ludogorets entered the second qualifying round of the UEFA Champions League for the 2012–13 season, but were eliminated 3:4 on aggregate with a last minute away goal by Dinamo Zagreb.

As Bulgarian champions in 2012–13 season, Ludogorets played in the UEFA Champions League where they came through the qualifiers, eliminating subsequently Slovan Bratislava and Partizan en route. Ludogorets then lost to Basel in the play-offs, but earned the right to play in the UEFA Europa League.

Ludogorets played in Group B of the 2013–14 Europa League. They were unbeaten in the group stage finishing first in the group with five wins in six games, including both home and away victories over the prominent PSV and Dinamo Zagreb. Their only dropped points were a 1:1 home draw with Chornomorets Odesa. In the knockout phase, Ludogorets beat the Italian cup holders Lazio 1:0 away and drew 3:3 at home for a 4:3 aggregate win, but then lost 0:3 at home and 0:4 on aggregate to Valencia in the round of 16.

In the 2014–15 UEFA Champions League, Ludogorets again won both their qualifiers, against F91 Dudelange of Luxembourg and Partizan. In the play-off, they defeated Steaua București to reach the group stage for the first time. Goalkeeper Vladislav Stoyanov was dismissed for a second yellow card in the last minute of extra time in the second leg, when Ludogorets had used all their substitutes. In the penalty shoot-out, centre-back Cosmin Moți, having converted the first penalty, went in goal and made two saves to put Ludogorets through 6:5 on penalties.

Ludogorets made their debut in the 2014–15 Champions League group phase on 16 September 2014, grabbing a 1:1 equalizer away against Liverpool in the 90th minute scored by Dani Abalo, but in an eventual 1:2 loss, as the newly signed goalkeeper Milan Borjan gave away a penalty with a foul on Javier Manquillo, which Steven Gerrard converted to give Liverpool the victory. Ludogorets made their home debut in the 2014–15 Champions League group phase on 1 October 2014, scoring a stunning goal in the sixth minute through' attacking midfielder Marcelinho against Real Madrid, but in an eventual 1:2 loss. In this match, Cristiano Ronaldo took two penalties – the first was saved by goalkeeper Vladislav Stoyanov, while the second was scored for a 1:1 equalizer. On 22 October 2014, Yordan Minev scored his first goal for Ludogorets, scoring a crucial last-minute winning goal in a 1:0 home win over Basel in the group stage of the Champions League. On 26 November 2014, Dani Abalo scored in the third minute and Georgi Terziev scored his first goal in the 88th minute, grabbing a 2:2 equalizer against Liverpool, in an eventual 2:2 draw.

Ludogorets won their 4th consecutive A Group title, but were left by several main squad players at the end of the season. Georgi Dermendziev was also replaced with Portuguese manager Bruno Ribeiro. The late changes saw Ludogorets being eliminated in the second qualifying round of the 2015–16 UEFA Champions League by the underdog Moldovan champions Milsami Orhei.

With Georgi Dermendzhiev returning at the helm of the squad, during the 2016–17 Champions League, Ludogorets won the qualifiers against Mladost Podgorica and Red Star Belgrade respectively, followed by a success in the play-off against Viktoria Plzeň. Eventually, they became the first Bulgarian team to qualify twice for the group stage of the tournament. In the group stage, Ludogorets achieved two draws against Basel and one against Paris Saint-Germain, which were enough to secure them the third place and a transfer to the knockout phase of the 2016–17 UEFA Europa League. Ludogorets however shortly exited the competition after failing to overcome Copenhagen with an initial 1:2 home loss and a 0:0 away draw.

Ludogorets failed to qualify for the groups of the next two editions of the Champion League, but however in both cases managed to enter the groups of Europa League. In the 2017–18 season they finished second in the group behind Braga, eliminating İstanbul Başakşehir and 1899 Hoffenheim, before losing in both matches to Milan in the round of 32.

In 2019–20, they were eliminated by Ferencváros in the first Champions League qualifying round, but made their way to the group stage of the Europa League, following successful matches against Valur, The New Saints and Maribor in the qualifiers. Ludogorets were subsequently drawn again with Ferencváros, next to CSKA Moscow and Spanish club Espanyol. A 5–1 home win against CSKA Moscow was followed-up by a 3–0 away win against Ferencváros. They lost twice to Espanyol, 1–0 at home and 6–0 away, but finished second, following two 1–1 draws against both CSKA and Ferencváros, eventually securing a place in the knockout stage.

75th Anniversary

Ludogorets earned their record-breaking 9th Bulgarian Premier League Title during their 75th Anniversary celebration on 8 July 2020 after their win 3:0 vs Levski Sofia. Ludogorets wore their special green and yellow retro kit which was used in 1945 when the club was founded. The logo with the "Л" letter over a yellow background is how the original looked like. The same design was used for a couple of decades, according to the archives. A limited edition of the retro kits were available for the fans. They feature the names of all the important team players over the course of 75 years.

Crest, shirt and mascot

 
Ludogorets' main kit colour is forest green and the away kit is white. In addition, a black alternative kit is also used in some domestic matches.

The club's current crest was introduced for the beginning of the 2016–17 season. Ludogorets' supporters chose the new crest, after a poll held on the club's official website, a total of 130 different crest variants were present. A second poll was then held, to pick one from the five most voted logos. However, some of Ludogorets' supporters expressed their dissent with the new crest, which they described as "lacking identity" and "unprofessional", a lack of continuity between the old and new club crests was also noted. Lastly, the supporters pointed out the striking similarity between the new crest and that of Sporting Lisbon. After winning their tenth championship title, Ludogorets added a golden star above their crest.

In June 2017, Ludogorets reached a sponsorship agreement with English sportswear manufacturer Umbro for the following two seasons. In June 2019, they reached a new long-term agreement with American sportswear manufacturer Nike.

Since 2014, the mascot of the team has been a female eagle called Fortuna, which was originally a gift from Lazio.

Players

First-team squad

For recent transfers, see Transfers summer 2022 and Transfers winter 2022–23.

Out on loan

Foreign players
Up to twenty foreign nationals can be registered and given a squad number for the first team in the First League, however only five non-EU/EEA nationals can be used during a match day. Those non-EU/EEA nationals with European ancestry can claim citizenship from the nation their ancestors came from. If a player does not have European ancestry he can claim Bulgarian citizenship after playing in Bulgaria for five years.

Retired numbers

Second-team squad

Club staff

Honours

Domestic trophies
First League:
 Champions (11): 2011–12, 2012–13, 2013–14, 2014–15, 2015–16, 2016–17, 2017–18, 2018–19, 2019–20, 2020–21, 2021–22
Bulgarian Cup:
 Winners (2): 2011–12, 2013–14
 Runners-up (1): 2016–17
Bulgarian Supercup:
 Winners (6 times – record): 2012, 2014, 2018, 2019, 2021, 2022
Bulgarian Second League:
 Winners (1): 2010–11 (East)

The Double:
(7 times): 2011–12, 2012–13, 2013–14, 2014–15, 2018–19, 2019–20, 2021–22

European
UEFA Champions League
Group stage (2):   2014–15, 2016–17
UEFA Europa League
Round of 16 (1):   2013–14
Round of 32 (3):   2016–17, 2017–18, 2019–20
Group stage (4):   2018–19, 2020–21, 2021–22, 2022–23

UEFA Europa Conference League
Round of 16 (1): 2022–23

European record

Matches
As of 24 February 2023 PFC Ludogorets has played vs 57 teams (from 37 federations).

Once against 50 teams and against 7 teams more than once: 
 FC Basel - 3 times;
 GNK Dinamo Zagreb - 3 times;
 Ferencvárosi TC - 2 times;
 FC Midtjylland - 2 times;
 FK Partizan - 2 times;
 Red Star Belgrade - 2 times;
 FK Žalgiris - 2 times.

PFC Ludogorets Razgrad is the first Bulgarian team has played in all three European tournaments(UCL, UEL, UECL).
Moreover in one and same season - 2022-23!

Notes
 1Q: First Qualifying round
 2Q: Second qualifying round
 3Q: Third qualifying round
 PO: Play-off round

UEFA club coefficient ranking

As of 4 December 2022

All-time European performance

Records and notable stats

Club records

 Biggest home win in First League: Ludogorets 7–0 Beroe Stara Zagora (18 April 2018)
 Biggest away win in First League: Minyor Pernik 0–7 Ludogorets (18 April 2012)
 Biggest home loss in First League: Ludogorets 0–2 Cherno More Varna (29 March 2012), Ludogorets 2–4 Litex Lovech (20 October 2013), Ludogorets 0–2 Beroe Stara Zagora (20 May 2016), Ludogorets 3–5 Pirin Blagoevgrad (13 December 2021)
 Biggest away loss in First League: CSKA Sofia 4–1 Ludogorets (12 May 2021)
 Most consecutive matches without lost in First League: 35 (2018–19) (5), (2019–20) (30)
 Most consecutive matches without win in First League (single season): 4 (2017–18)
 Most consecutive wins in First League (single season): 14 (2017–18)
 Most consecutive losses in First League (single season): 3 (2011–12)
 Biggest European home win: Ludogorets 7–0  Crusaders (11 July 2018, UEFA Champions League First qualifying round first leg)
 Biggest European away win:  The New Saints 0–4 Ludogorets (15 August 2019, UEFA Europa League Third qualifying round second leg)
 Biggest European home defeat: Ludogorets 0–3  Valencia (13 March 2014, UEFA Europa League Round of 16), Ludogorets 0–3  Milan (15 February 2018, UEFA Europa League Round of 32)
 Biggest European away defeat:  Arsenal 6–0 Ludogorets (19 October 2016, UEFA Champions League group stage),  Espanyol 6–0 Ludogorets (7 November 2019, UEFA Europa League group stage)

Individual records

 Most appearances:  Svetoslav Dyakov (350)
 Most goals:  Claudiu Keșerü (139)
 Most league appearances:  Svetoslav Dyakov (242)
 Most league goals:  Claudiu Keșerü (113)
 Most cup and supercup appearances:  Marcelinho (33)
 Most cup and supercup goals:  Claudiu Keșerü (10)
 Most European competition appearances:  Cosmin Moți (81)
 Most European competition goals:  Claudiu Keșerü (16) 
 Most capped Bulgarian player:  Stanislav Manolev - 51 caps
 Most capped foreign player:  Milan Borjan – 61 caps
 Most trophies won by player with Ludogorets:   Svetoslav Dyakov (16)
 Most trophies won by player:  Cosmin Moți (17)
 Youngest debutant:  Kristiyan Kitov (16 years 11 months 25 days)
 Youngest goalscorer:  Kristiyan Kitov (17 years 07 months 03 days)

Other records

 Ludogorets is the second team (along with Levadia Tallinn from Estonia) to win a domestic treble after being promoted from the second to the first level of the football league pyramid of its country.
 Ludogorets is the first team in Bulgaria to win 2 promotions in a row and then succeed in achieving a treble.
 The Bulgarian club with the most consecutive domestic league titles – 11 (2012–present).
 During the UEFA Europa League 2013–14 season Ludogorets became the first Bulgarian team to win a group in European competitions, recording 5 wins and 1 draw.
 Ludogorets became the first Bulgarian team to begin their group stage participation in European tournaments with 3 consecutive wins, when in the 2013–14 UEFA Europa League group stage they recorded consecutive wins against PSV (2–0), Dinamo Zagreb (3–0) and Chornomorets Odesa (1–0), without conceding a goal in any of the games.
 After the end of the 2013–14 UEFA Europa League group stage, Ludogorets became the first Bulgarian team to record 9 wins in European competitions in a single season, as well as the first Bulgarian team to record 5 away wins in European competitions in a single season.
 After the end of the 2014–15 UEFA Champions League group stage, Ludogorets became the first Bulgarian team to record points in that competition when they defeated Basel 1–0 at home. This was also the first home win for a Bulgarian team in the UEFA Champions League. 
 Ludogorets became the first Bulgarian team to qualify twice for the Champions League group stage, achieving the feat during the 2016–17 season of the tournament. During that season, the team set a new record for most goals scored (6), and became the first Bulgarian team to avoid finishing last in their group.
 On 19 September 2019 Ludogorets defeated CSKA Moscow 5–1 in the 2019–20 UEFA Europa League group stage, recording the biggest group stage win by a Bulgarian team.
 On 3 October 2019 Ludogorets defeated Ferencváros 0–3 in the 2019–20 UEFA Europa League group stage, recording the biggest away group stage win by a Bulgarian team.

Goalscoring and appearance records

Includes appearances in First League, Bulgarian Cup, Bulgarian Supercup, UEFA Champions League and UEFA Europa League.
Players in bold are still playing for Ludogorets.

Players in bold are still playing for Ludogorets.

Includes appearances in UEFA Champions League and UEFA Europa League.
Players in bold are still playing for Ludogorets.

Players in bold are still playing for Ludogorets.

Recent seasons

League positions

Rivalries

Rivalry with CSKA Sofia 
Updated 10 October 2022

Dates are in dd/mm/yyyy form.

Rivalry with Levski Sofia 
Updated 28 February 2023

Dates are in dd/mm/yyyy form.

Notable players
Had international caps for their respective countries, or held any club record. Players whose name is listed in bold represented their countries.

Bulgaria
 Mihail Aleksandrov 
   Marcelinho
 Yordan Minev
 Emil Gargorov 
 Svetoslav Dyakov
 Ivan Stoyanov 
 Stanislav Genchev 
 Georgi Kostadinov
  Ivan Čvorović 
 Vladislav Stoyanov 
 Hristo Zlatinski
 Georgi Terziev 
 Aleksandar Aleksandrov
   Wanderson
 Tsvetelin Chunchukov
 Daniel Naumov
 Tsvetomir Panov
 Anton Nedyalkov
 Plamen Iliev
 Stanislav Manolev
 Svetoslav Kovachev
  Cicinho
 Kiril Despodov
 Dominik Yankov
 Spas Delev
 Ivan Yordanov
 Todor Nedelev

Europe
 Christian Kabasele
 Simon Sluga
 Pieros Sotiriou
 Tero Mäntylä
 Dan Biton
 Taleb Tawatha
 Mladen Kašćelan
 Virgil Misidjan
 Jacek Góralski 
 Jakub Świerczok
 Cosmin Moți 
 Claudiu Keșerü 
 Andrei Prepeliță 
 Dragoș Grigore
 Adrian Popa
 Dorin Rotariu
 Ľubomír Guldan
 Roman Bezjak
 Žan Karničnik
 Igor Plastun

North America
 Milan Borjan

South America
 José Luis Palomino
 Júnior Caiçara
 Jonathan Cafu 
 Natanael
 Cauly
 Alex Santana
 Brayan Angulo
 Shaquille Pinas

Africa
 Manuel Cafumana
 Olivier Verdon
 Mavis Tchibota
 Jody Lukoki
 Jordan Ikoko
 Bernard Tekpetey
 Jorginho
 Anicet Abel 
 Stéphane Badji
 May Mahlangu 
 Hamza Younés

Notable managers

References

External links

  
Ludogorets at bgclubs.eu
Ludogorets at UEFA.com

 
Ludogorets
1945 establishments in Bulgaria
Association football clubs established in 1945